Killenaule is a small town and civil parish in County Tipperary, Ireland. It is part of the ecclesiastical parish of Killenaule and Moyglass, in the Roman Catholic Archdiocese of Cashel and Emly, and the barony of Slievardagh.

History

Killenaule came to national prominence in Ireland due to the discovery of the Derrynaflan Chalice. It was discovered in Derrynaflan Island in 1980 by Michael Webb and his son. They were scanning the area with a metal detector, then a relatively new device on the market. The chalice was part of the Derrynaflan Hoard, consisting of an 8th-century chalice, a strainer or ladle and a paten. They were enclosed in a bronze basin buried 45 cm below ground and found about 20 metres from a church ruin.

Demographics 
In the decade between the 1996 and 2006 census, the population of Killenaule decreased by 17.6% (from 725 to 597 people). In the following decade, between the 2006 and 2016 census, the population increased (to 652 people).

Sport
The local Gaelic Athletic Association club, Killenaule GAA, fields teams in both hurling and Gaelic football.

People
 Rachael Blackmore (b.1989), jockey, is from Killenaule.
 David Power Conyngham (1825–1883), journalist, war correspondent, and novelist

See also
 List of towns and villages in Ireland

References

External links
Parish website

Parishes of the Roman Catholic Archdiocese of Cashel and Emly
Civil parishes of Slievardagh
Towns and villages in County Tipperary